Sandy Haas (born May 8, 1946) is a Vermont lawyer and innkeeper. Since 2005 she has served as a Progressive Party member of the Vermont House of Representatives representing the Windsor-Rutland District.

Background
Haas was born on May 8, 1946, in Orange, California. She got her B.A. at the University of California, Berkeley in 1968, and her J.D. from Boalt Hall in 1974. She moved to Rochester in Windsor County, Vermont in 1980, and lives there with her partner David Marmor. She is retired from her former private legal practice, and keeps The New Homestead Bed & Breakfast in Rochester.

Political career 
She has been a member of Rochester's Planning Commission since 1982, and  served as a Trustee of Public Funds for Rochester from 1987 to 2003. In 2004, she was elected to the House of Representatives, and has served in that capacity ever since. She is assigned to the Corrections Oversight, Human Services and Judicial Rules committees, and is the present party caucus leader of the Progressives in the House.

Education
Sandy Haas has received her education from the following institutions:
JD, University of California, Berkeley, 1974
BS, University of California, Berkeley, 1968

Political Experience
Sandy Haas has had the following political experience:
Representative, Vermont State House of Representatives, 2004–present
Progressive Leader, Vermont State House of Representatives, former

Current Legislative Committees
Sandy Haas has been a member of the following committees:
Government Accountability, Member
Human Services, Vice Chair
Judicial Rules, Member

Caucuses/Non-Legislative Committees
Sandy Haas has been a member of the following committees:
Chair, Rochester Planning Commission
Rochester Trustee of Public Funds, 1987-2003

Professional Experience
Sandy Haas has had the following professional experience:
Innkeeper, New Homestead Bed & Breakfast
Lawyer, Private Practice

Organizations
Sandy Haas has been a member of the following organizations:
Board Member, Clara Martin Center, 1982–98
Board Member, White River Valley Players, 1984-2005

References 

1946 births
Living people
Vermont Progressive Party politicians
Members of the Vermont House of Representatives
Women state legislators in Vermont
UC Berkeley School of Law alumni
21st-century American politicians
21st-century American women politicians